Braxton County Schools is the operating school district within Braxton County, West Virginia. It is governed by the Braxton County Board of Education, located in Sutton.

Board of Education

The Braxton County Board of Education is made up of the following members:

Evelyn Post, President
Kevin Gregory
Larry Hardway
Dr. Kenna Seal
Lisa Ratliff

Schools

High schools
Braxton County High School, Sutton

Middle schools
Braxton County Middle School, Sutton

Elementary schools
Burnsville Elementary School, Burnsville 
Davis Elementary School, Gassaway
Flatwoods Elementary School, Flatwoods
Frametown Elementary School, Frametown
Little Birch Elementary School, Sutton
Sutton Elementary School, Sutton

References

External links
Braxton County Schools

School districts in West Virginia
Education in Braxton County, West Virginia